Rascals and Robbers: The Secret Adventures of Tom Sawyer and Huckleberry Finn is a 1982 American made-for-television adventure film originally broadcast February 27, 1982 on CBS as the TV Movie of the Week. CBS financed the film with a $2.2 million budget and the working title was The Further Adventures of Tom Sawyer and Huckleberry Finn. The film was shot on location in Natchez, Mississippi in the fall of 1981 where the filmmakers added dirt to the street of the historic town.  The movie features early roles for Cynthia Nixon and Anthony Michael Hall (co-starring as Huck). It was the first major role for then-child actor and future award-winning filmmaker  Patrick Creadon, who starred as Tom. The teleplay was written by Carlos Davis and David Taylor. It was directed by Dick Lowry and produced by his brother Hunt Lowry.

Production and locations
Filming began in late September 1981 in a wooded area near Natchez, Miss. and the first scene to be shot involved Tom and Huck escaping on horseback from the villain. The climactic cave sequences were filmed in DeSoto Caverns near Childersburg, Ala.

Plot and context
The movie is set shortly after the ending of The Adventures of Tom Sawyer as St. Petersburg prepares for its 50th anniversary. Although billed as a sequel, the teleplay includes several elements of Mark Twain's The Adventures of Tom Sawyer and The Adventures of Huckleberry Finn: Huckleberry bristling at the Widow Douglas' attempts to civilize him; Tom being caught by Aunt Polly while eating stolen jam; Tom and Huck's mysterious disappearance alarming the town; Tom eagerly smoking Huck's corncob pipe and getting sick; a scary journey through perilous caverns; an elaborate scheme to save a slave, etc.

The story sends Tom and Huck on an unexpected adventure after they overhear con artists planning to bilk the citizens of St. Petersburg into purchasing a bogus set of jewel-encrusted golden angel statues. The boys flee town, followed closely by Scree (Anthony James), the sinister leader of the villains. Huck and Tom rush to the river, but are temporarily separated when their raft splits in half. Huck hides out with a would-be cardsharp (Ed Begley Jr.) and Tom falls into Scree's clutches. Reunited, Tom and Huck get mixed up in a crooked poker game that ends disastrously and narrowly escape on horseback from the malicious Scree, who is determined to do away with them. Tom complains of hunger pangs and tries smoking Huck's corncob pipe as a distraction; it quickly makes him queasy. Tom and Huck's fortunes improve when they fall in with a ragtag traveling circus, run by the kind but boozy Arco the Magnificent (Anthony Zerbe). The boys help George (J.D. Hall), a freed slave, save his sister from a loathsome, wealthy family, and compete for the affections of Arco's lovely daughter, Alice (Nixon). After the group narrowly dodges the gun-toting Scree on the road, Tom leads his friends into MacDougall Cave, where they must creep through a cavern swarming with snakes. In the end, Tom and Huck expose Scree's scheme, bring the villains to justice—the supposedly precious statues turn out to be nothing but rocks—and save the day. But at the celebratory dinner honoring them, Tom catches a glimpse of what looks like a pirate wandering around outside the window and he and Huck sneak out of the party, looking for a new escapade.

Cast

Reception
Rascals and Robbers did not fare well in the Nielsen ratings, coming in 57th out of 64 shows the week it was broadcast. The film was nominated for three Primetime Emmy Awards in 1982 in the categories of editing, sound and art direction. Film Score Monthly noted it is "best remembered today for its highly enjoyable score by a young James Horner, completed mere days before he began work on his breakout success, 'Star Trek II: The Wrath of Khan'." Leonard Maltin gave the film an "Average" rating in Leonard Maltin's Movie and Video Guide. Gannett News Service TV critic Bill Hayden said, "Wholesome, diverting and entertaining describe this production. ... What it lacks in substance, it makes up for in pace, moving along fast enough to keep its young audience interested and grownups from becoming bored." Sky Cinema  said the film "looks good but lacks much of the flavour and bite of the original. All but the most undemanding of children are likely to get restless somewhere along the route of this rambling narrative which provides our heroes with adventures among slaves, con-men, outlaws and a circus." In "American Literature on Stage and Screen: 525 Works and Their Adaptations," Thomas S. Hischak calls the film "a highly entertaining kids' movie but not a true Twain work." Associated Press critic Fred Rothenberg deemed it "a ripoff, and a miserable one at that. ... so boring, it gives running away from home a bad name." John J. O'Connor of The New York Times News Service noted, "Tom and Huck (Patrick Creadon and Anthony Michael Hall respectively) are, of course, the rascals, refusing to go to choir practice and sneaking smokes in empty pickle barrels. ... By the time the boys emerge victorious back home ("Ain't it grand to be heroes," beams Tom), the action has flagged considerably in a number of spots, but the production, filmed in Natchez, Miss., continues to look good throughout. The young'uns might appreciate several of the less obvious plot contrivances."

Video release
According to The Palm Beach Post, the film was released on VHS by Playhouse Video in 1987. It has never officially been issued on DVD or Blu-ray.

References

External links

1982 television films
1982 films
1980s adventure films
American adventure films
Films based on American novels
Films based on adventure novels
Films based on The Adventures of Tom Sawyer
Films based on Adventures of Huckleberry Finn
Films about orphans
Films set in Missouri
Films shot in Mississippi
CBS network films
Films scored by James Horner
Films directed by Dick Lowry
Television shows based on works by Mark Twain
1980s American films